St Helen's Wood is a   Local Nature Reserve in Hastings in East Sussex. It is owned and managed by the St Helens Park Preservation Society.

The wood has many broad-leaved helleborines. There are also areas of grassland which are managed by horse grazing. Meadow flowers include red bartsia and green-winged orchids.

There is access from St Helen's Wood Road.

References

Local Nature Reserves in East Sussex
Hastings